Aankh Micholi or Aankh Michouli may refer to:

Aankh Michouli, 1942 film
Aankh Micholi, 1972 film
Aankh Micholi, 2022 film